The highest-selling albums and EPs in the United States are ranked in the Billboard 200, published by Billboard magazine. The data are compiled by Nielsen Soundscan based on each album's weekly physical sales.

Singer Usher's Confessions is the best-selling album of 2004, accumulating under eight million copies by the end of the year. The album debuted at number one on the Billboard 200 with sales of 1.096 million copies in the United States, breaking the record for the best opening sales week by an R&B act. Confessions gave Usher his first chart topper since he began releasing albums in the 1990s. Singer Norah Jones' Feels Like Home sold 3.8 million units, ranking as the second best-selling album of 2004. Feels Like Home is noted for its debut sales figure of 1.02 million, the second highest in a week by a female artist, behind singer Britney Spears' Oops!... I Did It Again which debuted with 1.32 million in 2000.

Chart history

See also
2004 in music
List of number-one albums (United States)

References

United States Albums
2004